William J. Duff (August 17, 1856 – May 26, 1922) was an American football player, medical doctor, and state legislator. He played college football for the University of Michigan in 1882 to 1884.

Duff was born in Allegheny City, Pennsylvania, in 1856. In 1868, the family moved to Fort Gratiot, now a part of Port Huron, Michigan. His father, George Duff, was an officer in the U.S. infantry stationed at Fort Gratiot. Duff attended the public schools of Port Huron and was sent to Ann Arbor High School for his preparatory education.

He enrolled at the University of Michigan where he studied medicine. While attending Michigan, he played college football for the 1882 and 1884 Michigan Wolverines football teams.

In 1885, Duff returned to Port Huron and entered the practice of medicine. During the Spanish–American War, he went to Cuba with the 33rd Michigan Volunteers. After the war, he served in the Michigan legislature in the sessions of 1899 and 1900. In June 1899, he married Wilhelmina Ross. They had one son, William Robert Mercer, born in 1901.

Duff died in May 1922 from angina pectoris.

See also
 1882 Michigan Wolverines football team
 1884 Michigan Wolverines football team

References

1856 births
1922 deaths
19th-century players of American football
Michigan Wolverines football players
People from Port Huron, Michigan
Players of American football from Pittsburgh
Players of American football from Ann Arbor, Michigan
Sportspeople from Metro Detroit